Apache is a 1931 novel by Will Levington Comfort based on the true story of Mangas Coloradas, chief of the Eastern Chiricahua Apaches.

References

Western (genre) novels
Books about Native Americans
Southwestern United States in fiction
Biographical novels
Apache culture
1931 American novels